The Substitute is a 1993 American thriller drama television film directed by Martin Donovan, written by David S. Goyer (under the pseudonym Cynthia Verlaine), and starring Amanda Donohoe as a murderous high school substitute teacher. The film also stars Dalton James, Natasha Gregson Wagner, and Mark Wahlberg (credited as Marky Mark) in his first acting role. It premiered on the USA Network on September 22, 1993.

Plot
In Albany, New York, high school English teacher Gayle Richards finds out that her husband Doug is cheating on her with Claire, one of her students. She murders both him and his mistress in an outburst of rage, sets their house on fire, and flees into the night. One year later, Gayle has moved to Baker Springs, Minnesota, and takes a job as a substitute English teacher at another high school under the assumed name Laura Ellington. One of the students, Josh Wyatt, becomes infatuated with "Laura" and on her first day, he gives her a ride back to her motel room where she seduces him, but discards him the following day.

As the scorned Josh seeks to find a way to get revenge against Laura for using him, she meets and begins having an affair of her own with Josh's widowed father, Ben, who is also infatuated with the mysterious and attractive teacher. While Josh seeks to keep his brief tryst with Laura a secret, he also recruits his unsuspecting girlfriend, Jenny, to help him find any evidence against Laura when she moves into the house across the street from him and his father.

Things become more complicated when news about her past starts to reemerge, forcing Laura to embark on yet another killing spree to protect her identity and her crimes. When Laura learns that the teacher she is substituting for will be returning early, she breaks into her house and shoves her down a staircase, causing the teacher to die from a heart attack. But Laura is witnessed entering the house by one trouble-making student, named Ryan Westerberg, who attempts to blackmail her. However, Laura kills Ryan and covers it up to make it look like a gang killing.

Convinced that Laura is responsible for the two mysterious deaths, Josh begins to uncover Laura's past by sneaking into her house one evening during a school dance and finds evidence of her former identity. But Josh cannot convince anyone, not even his skeptic father, that Laura is not who she claims to be. When Josh inadvertently reveals his tryst with Laura to Jenny, she breaks up with him. When Jenny tells Ben about Josh's cheating on her and of his personal investigation into Laura, she walks in on them. Later, Laura follows Jenny into the school and attempts to murder her too by chasing her under the bleachers in the school gym and pushes the automatic button to make the bleachers fold up, nearly crushing Jenny to death.

Jenny survives long enough to be brought to the hospital where she tells Josh what Laura did. After looking up old newspaper records at a library, Josh finally learns of Laura's past and real identity. When Ben confronts Laura that same evening in her classroom as she is attempting to pack up to flee town, she attacks and stabs him with a glass shard just as Josh walks in. He chases and confronts Laura on the roof of the school as the police arrive. Momentarily blinded by a police searchlight that's beamed onto her, Laura loses her balance and falls off the roof, landing some distance below on another part of the building. Leaving her for dead, Josh leaves the school building and is relieved to learn that his father is alive and will recover from his stab wound. But when the police venture to the roof, they find that Laura is gone.

In the final scene, Laura/Gayle is at another high school in another state, with a new alias, applying for a job as an English teacher at the school.

Cast
 Amanda Donohoe as Gayle Richards/Laura Ellington
 Dalton James as Josh Wyatt
 Natasha Gregson Wagner as Jenny
 Eugene Glazer as Ben Wyatt
 Marky Mark as Ryan Westerberg
 David Frankham as Riggs
 Christian Svensson as Dave Korczuk
 Molly Parker as Courtney
 Justine Priestley as Claire Bilino
 Gary Jones as Elliott
 Patricia Gage as Principal Beatty
 Shelley Owens as Amy Cooper 
 Brigitta as Margo
 Cusse Mankuma as Bernard
 Lossen Chambers as Kim
 D. Neil Mark as Rusty
 Martin Martinuzzi as Doug Richards
 Pat Bermel as Frank
 Meredith Bain Woodward as Fran
 Sheila Patterson as Mrs. Fisher
 Katherine Banwell as Ellen Schenkle
 Glen Mauro as Twin #1
 Gary Mauro as Twin #2
 Douglas Newell as Principal 
 Martin Cummins as Student (uncredited)

References

External links
 

1993 television films
1993 films
1993 drama films
1993 thriller films
1990s American films
1990s English-language films
1990s erotic drama films
1990s erotic thriller films
1990s high school films
1990s psychological thriller films
1990s thriller drama films
American drama television films
American erotic drama films
American erotic thriller films
American high school films
American psychological thriller films
American thriller drama films
American thriller television films
Films about murderers
Films about scandalous teacher–student relationships
Films directed by Martin Donovan (screenwriter)
Films set in Albany, New York
Films set in Minnesota
Films shot in Vancouver
Films with screenplays by David S. Goyer
Mariticide in fiction
USA Network original films